The Alagoas gubernatorial election was held on October 3, 2010, and October 31, 2010, to elect the next governor of Alagoas. Incumbent Governor Vilela Filho was running for reelection and won in a close runoff.

Candidates

References 

October 2010 events in South America
Alagoas gubernatorial elections
2010 Brazilian gubernatorial elections